David Robert Jones may refer to:

 David Robert Jones (musician) (1947–2016), English singer and actor, known professionally as David Bowie
 David R. Jones (biologist) (1941–2010), Anglo‐Canadian zoologist
 David Robert Jones (Fringe), fictional antagonist of the science-fiction television series

See also
 David Jones (disambiguation)